This is a list of nature centers and environmental education centers in the state of California.

To use the sortable tables: click on the icons at the top of each column to sort that column in alphabetical order; click again for reverse alphabetical order.

Resources
 California Association for Environmental and Outdoor Education

External links
Map of nature centers and environmental education centers in California

 
Nature centers
Nature centers
California
Nature centers